Line 4 of Xi'an Metro is a metro line running from north to south, in Xi'an, Shaanxi Province, China. It was opened on 26 December 2018. The line is colored Tiffany Blue on system maps.

Opening timeline

Stations (from North to South)

Notes

References

04
Railway lines opened in 2018
2018 establishments in China